Formally Twist N' Go, TNG is a motor scooter brand of CMSI, an importer, assembler, and distributor in the United States with more than 150 dealers and service centers. CMSI imports motor scooter components from China, Taiwan, Japan and the U.S. It assembles and tests its products in Preston, Washington. TN'G is the only brand whose scooters are assembled and tested in the United States before they are distributed to dealers.

Models include:

49cc:
LS 49
Venice 
Venice LX 
Milano
150cc:
Milano
Verona
Baja 
DR 150
Low Boy
Motorcycles:
Chicago 250cc

J.D. from the popular TV sitcom Scrubs drives a TN'G Venice.

External links
TN'G official website archived website as of 09-07-2011

Scooter manufacturers